The doucs or douc langurs make up the genus Pygathrix. They are colobine Old World monkeys, native to Southeast Asia, which consists of these 3 species: red-shanked douc, black-shanked douc, and gray-shanked douc.

Description 
The doucs are colobine Old World monkeys, which make up the genus Pygathrix. They are native to Southeast Asia.

Classification 
The doucs make up the genus Pygathrix, which consists of these 3 species:

 Red-shanked douc, Pygathrix nemaeus
 Black-shanked douc, Pygathrix nigripes
 Gray-shanked douc, Pygathrix cinerea

Even though they are known as "douc langurs", they are in fact more closely related to the proboscis monkey and snub-nosed monkeys than to any of the langurs. They are part of the subfamily Colobinae of the family Cercopithecidae.

Appearance 
Doucs have a distinct appearance. The red-shanked douc characteristically has bright maroon legs and reddish patches around the eyes. In contrast, the grey-shanked douc is less vibrant, with speckled grey legs and orange markings on the face. Both have dappled grey bodies, black hands and feet and white cheeks, although the cheek hairs of the red-shanked douc are much longer. The black-shanked douc has black legs. Their long hind limbs and tail allow these monkeys to be very agile in their treetop habitat.

Behavior 
They live in small family groups headed by one adult male. A single group may have several adult females, and many children. Young males unaffiliated with a family group often make their own troops. Females usually bear a single offspring at a time, which is suckled for about a year.

References

External links

 ARKive - images and movies of the black-shanked douc (Pygathrix nigripes)
 Primate Info Net Pygathrix Factsheets
 Fact sheet at San Diego Zoo